The 1998 season was Shimizu S-Pulse's seventh season in existence and their sixth season in the J1 League. The club also competed in the Emperor's Cup and the J.League Cup. The team finished the season third in the league.

Competitions

Domestic results

J.League

Emperor's Cup

J.League Cup

Player statistics

Other pages
 J.League official site

Shimizu S-Pulse
Shimizu S-Pulse seasons